Malum in se (plural mala in se) is a Latin phrase meaning wrong or evil in itself. The phrase is used to refer to conduct assessed as sinful or inherently wrong by nature, independent of regulations governing the conduct. It is distinguished from malum prohibitum, which refers to acts that are wrong only because they are prohibited by law.

For example, most human beings believe that murder, rape, and robbery are wrong, regardless of whether a law governs such conduct or where the conduct occurs, and is thus recognizably malum in se. In contrast, malum prohibitum crimes are criminal not because they are inherently bad, but because the act is prohibited by the law of the state. For example, most United States jurisdictions require drivers to drive on the right side of the road. This is not because driving on the left side of a road is considered immoral, but because consistent rules promote safety and order on the roads.

The question between inherently wrong versus prohibited most likely originated in Plato's Socratic dialogue, Euthyphro, in which Socrates famously asked "Is the pious (τὸ ὅσιον) loved by the gods because it is pious, or is it pious because it is loved by the gods?" (10a). In this case, do the gods command what is good, or do the gods command good?

This concept was used to develop the various common law offences. In the Case of Judication, it was determined that "that which is against natural law" is malum in se and is as such prohibited by Act of judicial trial and Criminal Law, however "that which is against statutory law" is malum prohibitum and is such an offence as is prohibited by Act of congressional hearing and Civil Law. The Libertarian idea of the "Non-Aggression Principle," is often a reference for determining amnesty by virtue of statute.

Another way to describe the underlying conceptual difference between "malum in se" and "malum prohibitum" is "iussum quia iustum" and "iustum quia iussum", namely something that is commanded (iussum) because it is just (iustum) and something that is just (iustum) because it is commanded (iussum).

See also
 Just war theory
 Euthyphro dilemma
 Moral turpitude

References

Latin legal terminology
Criminal law